Stepping Hill Hospital is in Stockport, Greater Manchester, England. It is managed by Stockport NHS Foundation Trust.

History

The facility was first established on Stepping Hill as the Stepping Hill Poor Law Hospital in December 1905. The facility became a military hospital during the First World War and joined the National Health Service as the Stepping Hill Municipal Hospital in 1948.

In an incident which began in July 2011, 3 patients were found to have been unlawfully killed by poisoning at the hospital. The United Kingdom's first prostate cancer operation using a hand-held robot was undertaken at the hospital in March 2012.

The Duchess of Gloucester officially opened a new medical and surgical centre built at a cost of £20 million in October 2017.

Notable births
Claire Foy, the Golden Globe Award winning actress and star of Netflix series The Crown and the BBC miniseries Wolf Hall, was born at the hospital in 1984 and England under-21 footballer Tom Ince was born at the hospital in 1992.

See also

 Healthcare in Greater Manchester
 List of hospitals in England

References

Hospital buildings completed in 1905
Buildings and structures in Stockport
Hospitals in Greater Manchester
NHS hospitals in England
1905 establishments in England